Belleview is a historic plantation house located near Ridgeway, Henry County, Virginia. It was built about 1783, and is a two-story, five bay, frame dwelling with a gable roof. It has an original two-story ell and a sun porch and one-story wing added in the mid-1950s.  The front facade features a two-tier portico supported by slender Greek Ionic order columns.

It was listed on the National Register of Historic Places in 1974.

References

Plantation houses in Virginia
Houses on the National Register of Historic Places in Virginia
Houses completed in 1783
Houses in Henry County, Virginia
National Register of Historic Places in Henry County, Virginia